The Haarlemse Huishoud en Industrieschool is a former huishoud school on the Voorhelmstraat, Haarlem, Netherlands. It is the oldest public day school for girls in Haarlem, built in 1901, which was renovated in 1935. It is currently rented as separate units for small businesses.

History

When the law for compulsory education (leerplicht) was passed in 1900 for children aged 6–12, this school for girls was opened in 1901, just around the corner from the Ambachtsschool for boys on the Kamperstraat. It was called the "Eerste Haarlemsche Huishoud- en Industrieschool", or "Household School".
The Huishoud school offered a three-year education and "extra classes". Some of the "extra class" names in the Household school were ‘nat en droogwaschen’ (wet and dry-cleaning), ‘strijken’ (ironing), ‘tafeldienen’ (waiting tables), ‘naaien van lijfgoed’ (sewing underwear) and ‘koken' (cooking) for workmen's wives. The extra classes were paid separately. For example the cooking class for children cost 1 guilder and fifty cents, but the meal could be eaten afterwards.

According to an article written by Johannes Bernardus van Loghem in the Architectural weekly "Architectura", the school had been quite dark and depressing with its old northern entrance with little light, and it serviced 1000 girls in 1935, when it was renovated by the architect . It also contained several small "family kitchen" rooms for cooking classes, and washing nooks for laundry.

In 2010 the school and its history was one of the subjects at the Historisch Museum Haarlem's exhibition "Leren voor het Leven" (learning for life), a compilation of materials from various vocational schools in the Haarlem area.

References

External link

Educational institutions established in 1901
Schools in Haarlem
Rijksmonuments in Haarlem
1901 establishments in the Netherlands